The Limavady Railway link by means of a branch line to the main Derry - Belfast line was closed on 2 May 1955.  The spur ran from Limavady Junction to Limavady Station.  The line then continued a further 7 miles to Dungiven. The Limavady to Dungiven section of the line was closed on 3 July 1950.

The terminus, Dungiven railway station, opened on 4 July 1883, closed for passenger traffic on 1 January 1933 and finally closed altogether on 3 July 1950.

Although the line was removed, remnants of the line can be found around Limavady, usually in the form of bridges, including the old railway bridge outside Limavady on the Seacoast Road.

References

Closed railways in Northern Ireland
Transport in County Londonderry
Limavady
Railway lines closed in 1955